The 1963 Bolivian Primera División, the first division of Bolivian football (soccer), was played by 8 teams. The champion was Aurora.

Major tournament of the Republic

External links
 Official website of the LFPB 

Bolivian Primera División seasons
Bolivia
1963 in Bolivian sport